Sam Ku West (1907–1930) was an American steel guitar player from Honolulu, Hawaii he died in Neuilly sur Seine near Paris, France.

Career
West first performed professionally as a member of  Irene West's touring band, adding the "West" surname to his birth name, Sam Ku, Jr.. After playing in Singapore in 1926, Prince George of England gave him the name "the Kreisler of the steel guitar". He also played concert harp live, though he never recorded with it.

West toured America on the vaudeville circuit and also performed abroad throughout East Asia and Europe. He recorded in 1927 and 1928 for several labels; 27 recordings are still extant. He died in Paris at the age of 23 on September 7, 1930.

Discography 

Partial listing:

References

External links
Sam Ku West Biography

1907 births
1930 deaths
Musicians from Hawaii
Vocalion Records artists
20th-century American musicians